The Sarco pod (also known as Pegasos and has been referred to as a "suicide pod") is a euthanasia device or machine consisting of a 3D-printed detachable capsule mounted on a stand that contains a canister of liquid nitrogen to die by suicide through inert gas asphyxiation. "Sarco" is short for "sarcophagus". It is used in conjunction with an inert gas (nitrogen) which decreases oxygen levels rapidly which prevents panic, sense of suffocation and struggling before unconsciousness, known as the hypercapnic alarm response caused by the presence of high carbon dioxide concentrations in the blood. The Sarco was invented by euthanasia campaigner Philip Nitschke in 2017. Nitschke said in 2021 that he sought and received legal advice about the device's legality in Switzerland.

History
The Sarco is an expansion of the hypoxic death provided by a suicide bag. Many people will not consider euthanasia by suicide bag for aesthetic reasons, or may feel claustrophobic inside a bag. Nitschke calls this the "plastic bag factor". The Sarco was developed to address these objections.

Mechanics
Access to the Sarco will be controlled by an online test to gauge mental fitness. If applicants pass, they receive an access code to a Sarco device that works for 24 hours.

Users of the Sarco can choose either a dark or transparent view from the capsule. The transparent view would be chosen if they wish to transport the machine to a particular location to see a certain vista from the machine. The inventor feels that "where you die is certainly an important factor".

The capsule of Sarco provides for a rapid decrease in oxygen level while maintaining a low level of carbon dioxide. On activation,  of liquid nitrogen causes the oxygen level to drop silently to less than 5% in less than one minute. According to Nitschke, 'The occupant presses the button and the capsule is filled with nitrogen. They will feel a bit dizzy but will then rapidly lose consciousness and die'.

Design and manufacture
The design of the device was a collaboration between Nitschke and Dutch industrial designer Alexander Bannink.

The design software allows for devices of different sizes to be made according to the client's dimensions. Nitschke has said that the design is intended to resemble that of a spaceship, in order to give users the feel that they are traveling to the "great beyond".

Nitschke planned to release the open source plans for the Sarco by 2019.

Reactions
Thaddeus Pope, a bioethicist at the Mitchell Hamline School of Law, said the debate over Sarco may result in a new way of approaching end-of-life options by legislators, saying that "That might be bigger or more important than the actual Sarco itself," and that Dr. Nitschke was "illustrating the limitations of the medical model and forcing us to think."

Critics have described the device as "just a glorified gas chamber", and others have raised concerns that it is glamourising suicide, and could lead to "suicide contagions" that inspire additional deaths.

See also
 Assisted suicide
 Bodily integrity
 Coup de grâce
 Dysthanasia
 Right to die
 Self-ownership
 Voluntary euthanasia

References

External links
 

Asphyxia
Euthanasia
Machines
Nitrogen
Suicide methods